Gabriel Ponce de León (born 14 March 1979 in Junín, Buenos Aires) is an Argentine racing driver. He has run in different series, with major success in Turismo Carretera and TC 2000.

He won the Formula Renault Argentina championship in 1998. He debuted in the TC 2000 championship the following year in the Ford YPF team of Oreste Berta. Win three titules, in 2001, 2003 and 2005. He was in the team until 2011. He remained in the series for two more years with Fiat Argentina and Honda Argentina factory-backed teams.

Since 2002, Ponce de León has been Turismo Carretera driver, where he was vice-champion in 2010. He has also competed in Top Race V6, including with the Toyota Gazoo Racing Argentina team. He was third in the 2007 championship.

Career 
1996: Formula Renault Argentina
1997: Formula Renault Argentina
1998: Formula Renault Argentina (Champion), TC 2000 (Ford Escort Zetec, YPF Ford)
1999: TC2000 (Ford Escort Zetec, YPF Ford)
2000: TC2000 (Ford Escort Zetec, YPF Ford)
2001: TC2000 (Ford Escort Zetec, YPF Ford) (Champion)
2002: TC2000 (Ford Escort Zetec, YPF Ford); Turismo Carretera (Ford)
2003: TC2000 (Ford Focus Zetecc, YPF Ford) (Champion); Turismo Carretera (Ford)
2004: TC2000 (Ford Focus Zetecc, YPF Ford), won the 200 km de Buenos Aires; Turismo Carretera (Ford)
2005: TC2000 (Ford Focus-YPF Ford) (Champion), Turismo Carretera (Ford); TRV6 (Ford)
2006: TC2000 (Ford Focus-YPF Ford); Turismo Carretera (Ford); TRV6 (Ford)
2007: TC2000 (Ford Focus-YPF Ford); Turismo Carretera (Ford); TRV6 (Ford)
2008: TC2000 (Ford Focus-Ford YPF); Turismo Carretera (Ford); TRV6 (Ford)
2009: TC2000 (Ford Focus-Ford YPF); Turismo Carretera (Ford); TRV6 (Ford)
2010: TC2000 (Ford Focus-Ford YPF); Turismo Carretera (Ford) (Vice-champion)
2011: TC2000 (Fiat Linea, Equipo Fiat Oil Combustibles); Turismo Carretera (Ford); Turismo Nacional Clase 3 (Fiat Línea)
2012: Súper TC 2000 (Honda Civic IX, Honda Petrobras); Turismo Carretera (Ford)
2013: Turismo Carretera (Ford); TRV6 (Volkswagen)
2014: Turismo Carretera (Ford)
2016: Turismo Carretera (Ford)
2017: Turismo Carretera (Ford); TRV6 (Toyota)
2018: Turismo Carretera (Ford); TRV6 (Toyota)
2019: Turismo Carretera (Ford); TRV6 (Toyota)
2020: Turismo Carretera (Ford)

References

External links
Official site 

TC 2000 Championship drivers
Turismo Carretera drivers
Top Race V6 drivers
Living people
Formula Renault Argentina drivers
1979 births
Stock Car Brasil drivers
Súper TC 2000 drivers
Toyota Gazoo Racing drivers